Alonso Zapata Ramirez (born August 22, 1958) is a Colombian chess grandmaster. He is an eight-time Colombian Chess Champion.

Chess career
Zapata has won the Colombian Chess Championship in 1980, 1981, 1995 (joint), 1996, 2000, 2002, 2004, and 2008.

Zapata played twelve times for Colombia in the Chess Olympiads (1978–1992, 1996–1998, 2002 and 2012).

He finished second, behind Artur Yusupov, in the 16th World Junior Chess Championship at Innsbruck 1977, tied for third and fourth at Havana 1983, and twice shared first at Cienfuegos in 1980 and Matanzas in 1994 (Capablanca Memorial).

Zapata was awarded the International Master (IM) title in 1980 and the GM title in 1984.

In 1988, Zapata beat future world champion Viswanathan Anand in only six moves.

In 2014, shortly after relocating to Atlanta, Zapata won the Southeast Open, held at Emory University, with 4.5/5.

In 2018, Zapata tied for first place in the inaugural National Senior Tournament of Champions.

In 2019, Zapata won clear first place in the Charlotte Chess Center's IM-B Norm Round Robin Tournament held in Charlotte, North Carolina with an undefeated score of 7.5/9.

Alonso Zapata also has a wife and two children, one who is 13, and another one who is 3 years old.

References

External links

1958 births
Chess grandmasters
Living people
Colombian chess players
Chess Olympiad competitors
20th-century Colombian people
21st-century Colombian people